Mohammad Riad Hussain Ismat (11 July 1947 – 13 May 2020) was a Syrian writer, critic and theatre director. He served as Minister of Culture of Syria from 3 October 2010 to 23 June 2012.

Early life, education and career
Ismat studied English literature at the Damascus University and graduated in 1968. In 2000, he became Rector of the Academy of Dramatic Arts, after years of teaching. In 2003, Ismat became Director General of Syrian State Radio and Television, then held the post of Syrian Vice-Minister of Culture. In 2005, he was appointed Ambassador to Pakistan and in 2010, Syrian Ambassador to Qatar. In October 2010, Ismat was appointed as Minister of Culture, serving in that post until 23 June 2012. From 2013 to 2014, he served as Buffett Center Visiting Scholar at Concordia University in River Forest, Illinois.

Theatre
Ismat directed more than 15 theatrical productions, including interpretations of Shakespeare, Tennessee Williams and Frank Wedekind, as well as producing his own personal vision of The Arabian Nights. He founded the first mime troupe in Syria and taught mime, acting and directing at the Higher Institute of Dramatic Arts in Damascus. There, he taught the Stanislavsky-based method of acting. 

His breakthrough as a playwright came with The Game of Love & Revolution; among his best known dramatic works are: Was Dinner Good, dear Sister; Mourning Becomes Antigone; Sinbad; Shahryar's Nights; Abla & Antar; Mata Hari; The Banana Republic and In Search of Zenobia.

Publications
Ismat published 35 books, including short stories and several books on Arab and World drama. He also wrote a book on the Nobel Prize laureate Naguib Mahfouz and a book on cinema. As a television script writer, he wrote the scripts for seven television serials and directed his own television trilogy for Syrian TV, The Artist & Love, 1985.

Death
Ismat died from COVID-19 in Evanston, Illinois, on 13 May 2020, at age 72, during the COVID-19 pandemic in Illinois.

See also
 Cabinet of Syria

References

External links
 Minister of Culture Mohammad Riad Hussain Ismat, SANA
 Ministry of Culture official government website
 
 

1947 births
2020 deaths
Alumni of the Drama Centre London
Syrian dramatists and playwrights
Damascus University alumni
Ambassadors of Syria to Pakistan
Ambassadors of Syria to Qatar
Politicians from Damascus
Syrian ministers of culture
Alumni of Cardiff University
Deaths from the COVID-19 pandemic in Illinois
Writers from Damascus